Yein is a form of group dance native to Myanmar (Burma). This dance form features multiple dancers synchronously dancing and moving their heads, waists, feet, and hands to the beats of music, often performed by a traditional Burmese orchestra called hsaing waing or drums.

Terms

Yein has historically been known by various terms, including nat aka (lit. 'spirit dance') during the Tagaung era, ka aka during the Myinsaing era, and myewaing aka (lit. 'earth circle dance') during the Konbaung era.

See also
Burmese dance
Thingyan

Burmese culture
Group dances